Lake Visitor is a lake in the Plav Municipality, Montenegro. 

It is a mountain lake, noted for its floating island.

References

Visitor